Mary Carmel Charles (15 July 1912 – 1999) was an author and the last fluent speaker of the Nyulnyul language of Western Australia. She was born to the Nyulnyul tribe in the Kimberley region of Western Australia at the Beagle Bay Mission. She played an important part in the documentation of the language and the writing of a Nyulnyul grammar, despite the fact that she was deaf.

The text in Charles's book, Winin, is bilingual and at the back of the small book is a guide to pronunciation of Nyulnyul words and word lists translating to and from English.

The story is a traditional story written for children.  It is set "In the dreamtime ...",  when the emu flies higher than all the other birds, and lives in the Milky Way.  The other birds who fly close to the ground are jealous.  The brolga tell the emu that if its wings were made smaller it would be able to fly even higher, and because the emu wants to fly higher it lets the other birds trim its wings.  With small wings, the emu can't fly at all and will always stay that way.

In the book Charles is quoted:

Bibliography
 Winin : Why the Emu Cannot Fly Magabala Books, 1993 illustrated by Francine Ngardarb Riches, translated by Bill McGregor

References

Indigenous Australian writers
Australian children's writers
1912 births
1999 deaths
Kimberley (Western Australia)
Australian women children's writers
20th-century Australian women writers
20th-century Australian writers
Indigenous Australians from Western Australia
Last known speakers of an Australian Aboriginal language